Xenopholis undulatus is a species of snake in the family Colubridae.

Geographic range
Xenopholis undulatus is found in Brazil and Paraguay.

References

Further reading
Freiberg, Marcos (1982). Snakes of South America. Hong Kong: T.F.H. Publications. 189 pp. . (Xenopholis undulatus, p. 113).
Jensen, Adolf Severin (1900). "Lagoa Santa Egnens Slanger. Et Bidrag til det indre Brasiliens Herpetologi. (With descriptions of three new species)". Videnskabelige Meddelelser fra den naturhistoriske Forening i Kjøbenhavn 1899: 99–111. (Oxyrhopus undulatus, new species, pp. 106–107, Figure 2). (in Danish and English).

Reptiles described in 1900
Colubrids
Snakes of South America